Johan Richard (J.R.) Danielson-Kalmari  (born Danielson) (7 May 1853, in Hauho – 23 May 1933, in Helsinki) was a Finnish Senator, professor of history, State Councillor  and one of the leaders of the Finnish Party. He was a Senator without portfolio in the Hjelt Senate from 1 August 1908 to 13 November 1909.

Danielson was the son of chaplain Johan Philip Danielson and Amanda Lovisa Palander. He received his Abitur in 1870, gained his undergraduate degree in 1876, Licenciate in 1878 and his Ph.D in 1881 from the Imperial Alexander University in Helsinki. Danielson worked as the editor-in-chief of the periodical Valvoja from 1881 to 1884. He was a teacher of German and History in the university in 1878 and a Docent of General History during 1878–1880, and finally a professor from 1880 to 1913. Danielson was the Deputy Chancellor of the Imperial Alexander University during 1903–1906 and as the Chancellor of the University of Turku from 1921 to 1926.

During the Diet of 1882 Danielson worked as a secretary of the general education committee. He was chosen to the Diet as a member of the clergy estate. He later took part in the Diets of 1885, 1888, 1891, 1894, 1897, 1899, 1900, 1904 and 1905. Danielson was also briefly the chairman of the Finnish Party and represented the party in the Parliament from 1907 to 1916.

Danielson married Jenny Matilda Heurlin in 1878.

Danielson bought a villa called Suviniemi in Vääksy, Asikkala, in 1892 and spent his summer there until his death. The municipality of Asikkala bought the villa from the Danielson-Kalmari's heirloom in 1986. Today, the restored Suviniemi is a historic house museum maintained by the municipality.

References

Further reading (in Finnish)
 Parliament of Finland biography
 Biography at the University of Helsinki

External links
 
 Johan Richard Danielson-Kalmari in 375 humanists 12.1.2015, Faculty of Arts, University of Helsinki

1853 births
1933 deaths
People from Hämeenlinna
People from Häme Province (Grand Duchy of Finland)
Finnish Party politicians
Finnish senators
Members of the Diet of Finland
Members of the Parliament of Finland (1907–08)
Members of the Parliament of Finland (1908–09)
Members of the Parliament of Finland (1909–10)
Members of the Parliament of Finland (1910–11)
Members of the Parliament of Finland (1911–13)
Members of the Parliament of Finland (1913–16) 
19th-century Finnish historians
Academic staff of the University of Helsinki
Chancellors of the University of Turku